Ahmed Ali Moadhed Al Samahi (born 13 December 1980) is an Emarati footballer .

Moadhed play all six matches at 2010 AFC Champions League.

External links
  Ahmad Statistics At Goalzz.com
http://www.alainfc.net/en/index.php?p=playerinfo&pid=336

Emirati footballers
Al Ain FC players
Al Ahli Club (Dubai) players
Fujairah FC players
Masafi Club players
1980 births
Living people
UAE First Division League players
UAE Pro League players
Association football midfielders